"All That Glisters" is the fourth episode of the second series of Space: 1999 (and the twenty-eighth overall episode of the programme).  The screenplay was written by Keith Miles; the director was Ray Austin.  The final shooting script is dated 9 March 1976.  Live-action filming took place Thursday 18 March 1976 through Wednesday 31 March 1976.

Plot

It is 565 days after leaving Earth orbit, and Eagle Four is outward bound from Moonbase Alpha.  Its mission is to locate and procure a quantity of milgonite.  Two days previously, spectroscopic analysis indicated the presence of the rare mineral in a distant solar system.  The ore—a vital component of the Moonbase life-support system—is detected on one planet.  As they will have little operating time on the surface, John Koenig orders the excursion Eagle fitted with a specialised laboratory module equipped to handle a variety of scientific duties.  During the long journey, Maya and mission specialist Dave Reilly assess the planet.

Reilly, an exploration geologist, has a career spanning from wildcat oil wells to uranium mining.  Though born and raised an Irishman, he considers the State of Texas home and affects the persona of an American cowboy—Stetson ten-gallon hat, cowboy boots and frequent use of Western colloquialisms (which contrast with his thick brogue).  To the chagrin of Tony Verdeschi, the geologist also loves the ladies and is brashly chatting up Maya.  As she fancies Verdeschi, the naïve Psychon girl is oblivious to Reilly's interest.

The planet is an ecological oddity.  Despite long-term geologic evidence of liquid water existing on the surface, it is one vast desert.  There is no sign of recent (or future) rainfall, despite the dense cloud formations.  The instruments also detect a minimal but unidentifiable form of life.  Unconcerned, the team sets down close to what sensors read is a major milgonite deposit.  Due to the Moon's extreme distance and velocity, the entire mining operation must be completed within a three-hour period of time.  The on-board computer is programmed to relay a verbal countdown in fifteen-minute increments.

Leaving Verdeschi and Helena Russell with the Eagle, Koenig and party disembark.  Traversing the terrain, Reilly's instincts lead the four into a gully containing a large luminescent rock formation.  Noting the distinctive yellow glow, the geologist rejoices at finding milgonite lying exposed on the surface...until his instruments state it is not milgonite.  Stubborn by nature, he is determined to analyse the substance.  After blasting off a sizable fragment with his stun-gun, he is perplexed by an odd liquid leaking from both the parent and sample rocks where the laser struck.

Returning to the Eagle, the computer analysis of the rock is inconclusive.  Trying to observe the sample with a petroscope, Verdeschi suddenly collapses when struck with an orange beam emitted by the rock.  Helena shocks the team when she pronounces him dead.  Further examination yields baffling results—there is brain activity and, apart from the heart, all Verdeschi's internal organs are functioning normally.  When Helena's attempts to resuscitate the security chief fail, Koenig angrily orders the rock removed.  A distraught Maya argues if there is a cure, it must lie in the rock.

Reilly leaves the ship, stating his job is to find milgonite.  Assisted by Alan Carter, he scans the parent rock.  His geophysical assessment confirms it is not milgonite, but an amalgam of several other minerals.  As Koenig and Maya arrive, Reilly intends to inspect a smear of the rock fluid under a portable microscope.  Koenig protests, but Maya insists research is necessary to save Verdeschi.  The fluid is found to contain structures similar to blood corpuscles—the rock is a living organism.

On the Eagle, Helena is puzzled by signs of elevated brain activity in Verdeschi.  When engulfed in a yellow ray, he rises zombie-like from the examination table and exits the craft.  Helena calls Koenig with the news, speculating the rock is controlling the man.  As the team searches the desert, Verdeschi mindlessly plods into the gully and shoots off another rock fragment.  He carries it back to the Eagle and places it next to the first.  While Verdeschi lies back down on the table, the two rocks glow furiously and, with energy arcing between them, fuse into a single, larger body.

Terminating the mission, Koenig orders an immediate lift-off—but all flight systems are dead and radio contact with Alpha severed.  With the rock now in control of the Eagle (and the departure countdown at one hour forty-five minutes), Koenig moves to throw it outside.  In response, the rock's glow turns blue.  When struck by a beam of the same colour, Koenig is briefly transfixed by an agonising paralysis.  When released, he retreats and the rock reverts to yellow.  The Commander wonders which colour will kill.

Before this latest assault, Reilly and Maya had left the ship:  he to prospect for milgonite, she to study the mystery rock.  Koenig and Carter join them, relating the rock's recent behaviour.  To Reilly's amusement, the others speculate that the rock is an intelligent life-form.  This 'being' somehow presented a false milgonite reading to Computer in order to lure the Alphans to this planet.  Once aboard the Eagle, it enslaved Verdeschi to bring it reinforcements.  Maya reckons that if it is alive and intelligent, she could open a dialogue.   Using her power of molecular transformation, the Psychon woman transforms into an identical rock.  After a short interlude, she returns to normal, frustrated by the rock's refusal to communicate.

Just then, Helena calls, telling them the rock is now glowing green.  Fearing this could be the death colour, Koenig orders her to vacate immediately.  Moving for the hatch, she is obstructed by multiple beams of green energy, which herd her into a corner.  Helena watches as another ray plays over their supplies, as if searching for a specific item.  She makes a break for the exit, but is caught by the green light.  The doctor slips to the floor, conscious but paralysed by an all-pervading numbness.  Hurrying back to the Eagle, the team discover none of their commlocks will open the hatch.

As Helena remains helplessly pinned, another beam resumes probing the cargo area.  Alighting on the water tank, it intensifies.  Pulled through the tank's walls, a jet of water streams across the module to be absorbed by the rock.  After draining the container, the rock's pulsing glow strengthens.  Helena relays these facts via the open commlock channel.  Outside, Koenig and company realise the rock-forms need water to survive.  Some meteorological event in the past stopped the rain cycle; over time, the rocks drained this planet dry.  Many of the surrounding 'normal' rocks are probably deceased members of the species.

With any doubt as to the rock's true nature dispelled, Reilly is fascinated by the idea of a sentient 'petro-form'—and the professional paper he could author.  Maya grimly reminds the team that the human body is mostly water...and Helena is still trapped inside.  The doctor is released when the rock reverts to yellow and begins probing the command-module instruments with its light-rays.  As she tries and fails to open the hatch, the rock activates the ship's engines.  While Koenig and company watch, the Eagle ascends into the sky...only to return a moment later.  The team comes to the disturbing conclusion the rock was testing its ability to pilot the ship.

As the others discuss their chances of freeing Helena and escaping with their lives, Reilly is scorned for obsessing over the rock (having expressed more concern for the loss of the bizarre rock than Helena or the Eagle during the aborted hijacking).  Aboard the ship, the rock engages the on-board computer and screens the star charts, searching for a planet with water.  Since it cannot leave the rest of itself behind, Koenig correctly predicts Verdeschi will be sent to fetch further specimens.

They lay an ambush at the gully.  When the security chief arrives, Koenig and Carter each hit him with a stun-blast, hoping the energy will overcome the rock's influence.  They are amazed as Verdeschi dematerialises in a burst of light—leaving his commlock and stun-gun behind.  Helena calls with the news that Verdeschi has reappeared aboard the Eagle.  To her relief, the plan was successful; his heart is beating and he is slowly regaining consciousness.

During this, Reilly surreptitiously appropriates the commlock.  Hoping to redeem himself by freeing the hostages, he dashes back to the Eagle.  After opening the hatch, he shoves both doctor and patient to safety outside, then confronts the rock with his drawn weapon.  In self-defence, the rock immobilises the geologist with the green ray.  It then uses the orange beam, and Reilly crumples to the floor in cardiac arrest.

Outside, Maya is put to work adjusting a stun-gun.  By boosting the laser discharge, Koenig hopes to weaken the rock.  Knowing Reilly will soon be activated to gather another rock segment, Koenig plans on creating a diversion to sneak aboard and shoot it with the modified laser.  The diversion will be Maya.  Disguised as a rock, she is placed in the path between the Eagle and the parent rock's gully.  Reilly is reanimated and retrieves the Maya/Rock from the desert.  Brought aboard the Eagle, she placed beside to the real rock.

Koenig and Carter dash through the still-open hatch.  Before the Commander is able to fire the gun, they are both immobilised in the pain-generating blue light.  The rock also begins to draw the Maya/Rock toward itself.  While trying to resist the fusion process, the Psychon girl cannot revert to normal.  Manifesting a voice, she tells them to fight the paralysing beam; the rock is concentrating most of its energy on assimilating her.  After they manage to break away, the rock glows with a red light—the death colour, Maya exclaims.

Dodging the lethal red rays, Carter draws the rock's attention, giving Koenig the opportunity for a clean shot.  He fires and the rock goes dark, killed by the intense dehydrating effect of the quadruple-strength laser blast.  After summoning the others, Koenig heaves its carcass out into the desert.  With the countdown at a critical fifteen minutes, the team hustles aboard and Carter takes the ship up in a crash lift-off.  In retrospect, the Alphans regard the rock more sympathetically.  They realise its actions were the result of desperation, not malice.

After her terrifyingly close encounter with the petro-form, Maya knows the parent rock will die in a matter of hours unless it receives water.  She and Reilly simultaneously come to the conclusion that if they seed the clouds with nucleoid-active crystals, the rain cycle may restart in time to save it.  Making a pass over the gully area, the crew carries out its rain-making mission of mercy.  As they depart, storm clouds gather and a hard rain begins to fall...

Cast

Starring
 Martin Landau — Commander John Koenig
 Barbara Bain — Doctor Helena Russell

Also Starring
 Catherine Schell — Maya

Featuring
 Tony Anholt — Tony Verdeschi
 Nick Tate — Captain Alan Carter

Guest Star
 Patrick Mower — Dave Reilly

Uncredited Artist
 Barbara Kelly — Computer Voice

Music

The score was re-edited from previous Space: 1999 incidental music tracks composed for the second series by Derek Wadsworth and draws primarily from the scores of "The Metamorph" and "The Exiles".

Production notes

 It has been well documented that "All That Glisters" was greatly disliked by both director Ray Austin and the cast alike.  Martin Landau was known for doodling and writing frank comments on his copy of each episode's script; the notes for this episode were especially contentious:  'All the credibility we're building up is totally forsaken...story is told poorly!  Characters go out the window...the character of Koenig takes a terrible beating in this script—we're all shmucks!'  Exasperated with shooting a leading character that was a lump of papier-mâché, Austin purportedly delivered a large rock the size of a cannonball to producer Fred Freiberger's office one morning with the attached note: 'I name this rock Freiberger'.  On completing this episode, Austin ended his association with the programme; after directing one episode of The New Avengers, he would relocate to America.  
 Landau had enjoyed considerable creative input throughout the first series; that ended when Freiberger became show runner.  Years later, Tony Anholt would comment: 'Martin was desperately unhappy about the whole script; he thought it was absolute rubbish.  We all did.  Freddie, once he saw the opposition, just became utterly entrenched and would give nothing at all—that was "the greatest episode of the series, it was the most sci-fi type of story."  It was going to stay, and he was going to prove his point.'  Though tempted to walk off the set, Landau and his fellow castmates ultimately refused to sabotage the production and played the episode as written.  (Viewers will note that Landau's mood bled through into his performance:  Koenig appears especially irritable and short-tempered in this installment.)
 This episode featured the smallest cast in the programme's history:  five regulars and one guest artist (not including the uncredited dialogue of the Eagle computer).  No scenes took place on Moonbase Alpha; the only standing sets used were the Eagle command module and an expanded passenger module-cum-laboratory.  Material trimmed from the final cut includes a sequence where Reilly speculated that the rock was the fall-out of a cosmic storm and had been on the planet for fifty thousand years.  This would have appeared during his second examination of the rock with Maya.

Novelisation

The episode was adapted in the sixth Year Two Space: 1999 novel The Edge of the Infinite by Michael Butterworth, published in 1977.  This novel was not released in the United Kingdom and only as a limited edition in the United States and Germany.  In this adaptation, taking place after 25 December 2005, the Moon is on the brink of leaving the galaxy and the panicked Alphans are taking every opportunity to stockpile raw materials to survive as long as possible in the intergalactic void.  The search for milgonite on this planet was part of this hoarding exercise.

In the 2003 novel The Forsaken by John Kenneth Muir, it is stated the events of this episode were one of the consequences of the death of the eponymous intelligence depicted in "Space Brain".  The Brain controlled the planet's climate to provide an endless supply of water for the silicon-based life forms; after its death, the drought began and the beings would become desperate in their search for the life-giving fluid.

References

External links
Space: 1999 - "All That Glisters" - The Catacombs episode guide
Space: 1999 - "All That Glisters" - Moonbase Alpha's Space: 1999 page

1976 British television episodes
Space: 1999 episodes